James Dougherty (April 12, 1921  – August 15, 2005) was an American police officer, the first trainer of Special Weapons and Tactics. He is best known as the first husband of actress Marilyn Monroe.

Biography 
James Edward Dougherty was born on April 12, 1921, in Texas. He was the fifth and final child of Edward and Ethel Dougherty (née Beatty), natives of Pueblo, Colorado. After moving to Globe, Arizona, the family suffered from the Great Depression, living in a tent. Dougherty graduated from the Van Nuys High School in 1938, in the same class as actress Jane Russell.

Following his graduation, Dougherty turned down an athletic scholarship from the University of California at Santa Barbara. Instead, he worked the night shift at Lockheed Aircraft, meeting Norma Jean Baker. Following the move of her foster-parents, Baker's return to an orphanage was prevented when Dougherty married her on June 19, 1942. She dropped out of high school and became a housewife. They moved to Santa Catalina Island, where Dougherty joined the Merchant Navy and taught sea safety.

In April 1944, Dougherty was posted to the South Pacific. Baker moved back to Van Nuys, where she was noticed by the photographer David Conover. She later signed a contract with the Blue Book Model agency and 20th Century Fox, who stipulated that she must be unmarried.

Therefore, Baker divorced Dougherty in 1946. He received the divorce papers while on the Yangtze and dismissed her ambitions. However, he followed her career as the actress Marilyn Monroe, and after her death he appeared on the CBS show To Tell The Truth and gave numerous interviews. He commented in 2002:

In 1947, Dougherty married Patricia Scoman, and they had three daughters. In 1949, he joined the Los Angeles Police Department and served as a detective. He played a part in the creation of the Special Weapons and Tactics group, becoming the first officer to train it. He also broke a plot to kidnap James Garner.

Dougherty married his final wife, Rita Lambert, in 1974.  Together, they moved to her hometown in Sabattus, Maine, where he taught at the Criminal Justice Academy and worked as an Androscoggin County commissioner. He also worked for the Maine Boxing Commission and appeared in the documentary The Discovery Of Marilyn Monroe, along with actor Robert Mitchum and high school friend Jane Russell.

Dougherty and Russell also appeared on Sally in 1992, accompanied by Susan Strasberg. He wrote and released two memoirs, The Secret Happiness of Marilyn Monroe and To Norma Jeane With Love, Jimmie.

In 2003, Dougherty's wife died. Marilyn's Man, a documentary about Dougherty, was filmed in 2004. He died on August 15, 2005. His death made a standalone obituary in several outlets, including the Los Angeles Times, the Chicago Tribune, and The New York Times.

References 

Marilyn Monroe
1921 births
2005 deaths
United States Merchant Mariners of World War II
Van Nuys High School alumni
People from Globe, Arizona
Los Angeles Police Department officers
People from Androscoggin County, Maine